Rhotia is an administrative ward in the Karatu district of the Arusha Region of Tanzania. According to the 2012 census, the ward has a total population of 24,268. Rhotia is the second most populous ward in Karatu district.

References

Karatu District
Wards of Arusha Region